Saddle Mountain is a  mountain summit located in Yellowstone National Park, in Park County, Wyoming, United States.

Description 
The peak is situated in the northeast quadrant of Yellowstone National Park and is the 20th-highest peak within the park. It is part of the Absaroka Range, which is a subset of the Rocky Mountains. Neighbors include Little Saddle Mountain 1.5 mile to the southwest, Castor Peak 3.98 miles to the south-southeast, and Pollux Peak 4.07 miles to the southeast on the opposite side of the Lamar River Valley. The mountain's name, which was officially adopted in 1930 by the United States Board on Geographic Names, was in use before 1899 when Henry Gannett published it in A Dictionary of Altitudes in the United States.

Climate 
According to the Köppen climate classification system, Saddle Mountain is located in a subarctic climate zone with long, cold, snowy winters, and cool to warm summers. Winter temperatures can drop below −10 °F with wind chill factors below −30 °F. Precipitation runoff from the mountain drains into tributaries of the Lamar River.

See also
 List of mountains and mountain ranges of Yellowstone National Park

References

External links
 Weather forecast: Saddle Mountain
 Saddle Mountain: NGS Data Sheet

Mountains of Park County, Wyoming
Mountains of Wyoming
North American 3000 m summits
Mountains of Yellowstone National Park